Chehra Maut Ka is a Hindi horror film directed by Inder Kumar Gupta and produced by N.C. Vasani. This film was released on 28 September 2001 under the banner of Gee Vee Films Combine.

Plot

Cast
 Kiran Kumar as Inspector
 Mac Mohan
 Kishore Bhanushali
 Ghanashyam Nayak
 Mamta Singh
 Mahesh Raj
 Rani Sinha
 Birbal
 Prashant Jaishwal

References

External links 
 

2001 films
2000s Hindi-language films
Indian horror films
2001 horror films
Hindi-language horror films